The Kh-58 (NATO:AS-11 'Kilter') is a Soviet anti-radiation missile with a range of 120 km.   the Kh-58U variant was still the primary anti-radiation missile of Russia and its allies. It is being superseded by the Kh-31. The NATO reporting name is "Kilter".

Development
The Bereznyak design bureau had developed the liquid-fuelled Kh-28 (AS-9 ‘Kyle’) and the KSR-5P (AS-6) anti-radiation missiles. They merged with Raduga in 1967, so Raduga was given the contract in the early 1970s to develop a solid-fuel successor to the Kh-28 to equip the new Su-24M 'Fencer-D' attack aircraft. Consequently, the project was initially designated the Kh-24, before becoming the Kh-58.

During the 1980s a longer-range variant was developed, the Kh-58U, with lock-on-after-launch capability. Since the fall of the Soviet Union, Raduga have offered several versions for export.

Design
It was designed to be used in conjunction with the Su-24's L-086A "Fantasmagoria A" or L-086B "Fantasmagoria B" target acquisition system.

Like other Soviet missiles of the time, the Kh-58 could be fitted with a range of seeker heads designed to target specific air defence radars such as MIM-14 Nike-Hercules or MIM-104 Patriot.

Operational history
The Kh-58 was deployed in 1982 on the Su-24M 'Fencer D' in Soviet service. The Kh-58U entered service in 1991 on the Su-24M and MiG-25BM 'Foxbat-F'. The Kh-58E version can be carried on the Su-22M4 and Su-25TK as well, while the Kh-58UShE appears to be intended for Chinese Su-30MKK's.

Variants

 Kh-58 (Izdeliye 112) - original version for the Su-24M.
 Kh-58U - improved version with longer range and lock-on-after-launch.
 Kh-58E - export version of Kh-58U, first offered in 1991.
 Kh-58EM - another version offered for export in the 1990s.
 Kh-58UShE (Uluchshennaya Shirokopolosnaya Exportnaya meaning 'Improved, Wideband, Export') - new wideband seeker in new radome, intended for Su-30MK.
 Kh-58UShKE - version with folding fins for internal carriage in the Sukhoi Su-57, first unveiled at MAKS 2007.
 Kh-58UShKE(TP) - version with added imaging infrared UV seeker, first unveiled at MAKS 2015.

Some Western sources have referred to a Kh-58A that is either optimised for naval radars or has an active seeker head for use as an anti-shipping missile - it probably represents another name for the Kh-58U.

Operators

Current operators

 Algerian Air Force

 Belarusian Air Force

 Indian Air Force

 Islamic Republic of Iran Air Force

 Malaysian Air Force

 Peruvian Air Force

 Russian Air Force

Former operators

 Iraqi Air Force

 Soviet Air Forces

 Ukrainian Air Force

See also
 Martel missile - Anglo-French collaboration with 60 km range
 AGM-88 HARM - Current US Air Force anti-radar weapon, range of 150 km

References

Further reading

External links
 Tuomas Närväinen's Homepage - useful details

Anti-radiation missiles of Russia
Anti-radiation missiles of the Soviet Union
Air-to-surface missiles of the Soviet Union
Air-to-surface missiles of Russia
MKB Raduga products
Anti-radiation missiles of the Cold War
Military equipment introduced in the 1980s